Jean-Philippe Dehon (born 6 April 1956 in Sebourg, France) is a retired French football player and manager.

Club career
Dehon has played the majority of his career at FC Metz.

References

External links
Profile

1956 births
Living people
Sportspeople from Nord (French department)
Association football midfielders
French footballers
FC Metz players
Tours FC players
Olympique de Marseille players
Bourges 18 players
SC Hazebrouck players
Ligue 1 players
Ligue 2 players
French football managers
Footballers from Hauts-de-France